Giorgio Sadotti (born 1955 in Manchester, UK) is a conceptual artist based in London.

In 1993, Sadotti exhibited at City Racing, and in 1996 participated in a group show organised by City Racing at Bricks and Kicks in Vienna run by Muntean and Rosenblum. Other solo exhibitions include the Henry Moore Institute (2006).

He described his work, Went to America Didn't say a word (1999): 
"On the morning of Saturday March 20, 1999, I flew on American Airlines from London Heathrow to New Yorks John F. Kennedy airport. I was wired for sound and upon arrival switched on my mini-disc recorder. I stayed overnight at a hotel on Lexington and 21st and flew back to London the following evening whilst in America I didn't say a word, but all my waking hours were recorded.
He then exhibited the recordings in a three day exhibition. In order to experience the whole show the spectator would have to stay in the gallery for the full duration."

His work is held in the collection of the Tate and the British Council Art Collection. In 2003 he won a Paul Hamlyn Award for visual arts.

In December 2012, Sadotti exhibited in a one-person show at studio1.1, east London.

References

1955 births
Living people
English contemporary artists
British contemporary artists
British people of Italian descent
English people of Italian descent
Artists from Manchester